Susan A. Miller is an American Indian historian and past faculty member at Arizona State University within the American Indian Studies Program. She currently lives in Lincoln, Nebraska. She is member of the Tiger Clan and Tom Palmer Band of the Seminole Nation and attended the University of Nebraska. She has made important contributions to academia in respect to Native American history. As a historian, she has written pieces that look to educate the masses in America about the myths and lies that have been taught about Native Americans since colonization. She has helped to retell history as well as study how other academics have contributed to countering the falsities about Native American History. Some of her works are:
 Coacoochee’s Bones: A Seminole Saga (University Press of Kansas, 2003)
 Wíčazo Ša Review: A Journal of Native American Studies 20:1 (Spring 2005), pp. 23–47
 "Licensed Trafficking and Ethnogenetic Engineering," American Indian Quarterly 20:1 (Winter 1996), pp. 49–55; reprinted in Natives and Academics, edited by Devon A. Mihesuah, pp. 100–110 (University of Nebraska Press, 1998)  
 Native Historians Write Back: Decolonizing American History (Texas Tech University Press, 2011)
 "Native America Writes Back: The Origin of Indigenous Paradigm in Historiography"
 "The Indigenous Paradigm in American Indian Historiography"
 "Seminoles and Africans under Seminole Law: Sources and Discourses of Tribal Sovereignty and “Black Indian” Entitlement":

Important writings 
Native Historians Write Back: Decolonizing American History: This book looks to rewrite American history in context of the American Indian story. Susan Miller contributed three of the chapters. The book is compiles works by various authors that all focus on the theme of "decolonizing" America.
"The Origin of Indigenous Paradigm in Historiography": This composition looks at how different historians and authors have started to talk more in academia about the rights of Native peoples today. Although Native peoples face different types of problems, the work shows how many activists from different tribes have come to form a community and share in common hardships, working to "decolonize" America. The paper focuses on four main concepts: indigenousness, sovereignty, colonization, and decolonization. It also looks at the ways research has been conducted and developed within these conversations. The chapter concludes with a group of writings and a summary of events leading up the World Council of Indigenous Peoples in 1975. 
"The Indigenous Paradigm in American Indian Historiography": This chapter gives a synopsis of the true American Indian history. 
"Seminoles and Africans under Seminole Law: Sources and Discourses of Tribal Sovereignty and “Black Indian” Entitlement": In 2000, the Seminole nation changed their constitution so that two African American communities were no longer to be considered as members of the Seminole tribe. This was seen my many outside of the Seminole nation as a U.S. government policy issue. Miller studies the sovereignty of the Seminoles and argues that these African American communities, called Freedmen, are not, in fact true members of the Seminole nation. Additionally, in accordance to the U.S.-Seminole of 1866, the right to remove these groups is held by the Seminole nation alone. 
Coachoochee's Bones: A Seminole Saga: This book is a study of the Seminole leader, Coachoochee, and his people. As Miller herself is a Seminole, she is able to give an insider perspective to her audience. Her writing focuses on Coachoochee's leadership in the resistance against the United States government as the Seminoles were forced off of their Florida home to current day Oklahoma. Additionally, the book touches on controversial topics such as Black Seminoles as well as the return of the Seminoles to their original lands that the Kickapoo now inhabit.

References 

 "Miller, Susan". http://www.blackpast.org/contributor/miller-susan
 Miller Susan. "Native America Writes Back: The Origin of Indigenous Paradigm in Historiography". Project Muse. Spring 2009.
 Amos, Alcione. "Review of Coachoochee's Bones: A Seminole Saga". Great Plains Quarterly. 2004. <http://digitalcommons.unl.edu/cgi/viewcontent.cgi?article=3434&context=greatplainsquarterly>.
 Miller Susan. "Seminoles and Africans under Seminole Law: Sources and Discourses of Tribal Sovereignty and “Black Indian” Entitlement". Project Muse. Spring 2005. <https://muse.jhu.edu/article/180306>.

1978 births
Living people
University of Notre Dame faculty
Yale Divinity School alumni